Euperilampus triangularis is a species of chalcid wasp in the family Perilampidae.

References

Further reading

External links

 

Parasitic wasps
Insects described in 1829
Chalcidoidea